Brooker is a town in Bradford County, Florida, United States. The population was 338 at the 2010 census.

History
A post office was established under the name Vandy, and the post office was renamed Brooker in 1894. The town was named for Ed Brooker, an early settler.

Geography
Brooker is located in western Bradford County at  (29.888922, –82.331397).

Demographics

As of the census of 2000, there were 352 people, 123 households, and 93 families residing in the town. The racial makeup of the town was 97.44% White, 0.57% African American, 1.14% from other races, and 0.85% from two or more races. Hispanic or Latino of any race were 3.12% of the population.

There were 123 households, out of which 36.6% had children under the age of 18 living with them, 60.2% were married couples living together, 13.8% had a female householder with no husband present, and 23.6% were non-families. 22.8% of all households were made up of individuals, and 8.9% had someone living alone who was 65 years of age or older.  The average household size was 2.69 and the average family size was 3.16.

In the town, the population was spread out, with 26.1% under the age of 18, 8.8% from 18 to 24, 24.1% from 25 to 44, 25.0% from 45 to 64, and 15.9% who were 65 years of age or older.  The median age was 38 years. For every 100 females, there were 86.2 males.  For every 100 females age 18 and over, there were 88.4 males.

The median income for a household in the town was $40,000, and the median income for a family was $40,938. Males had a median income of $29,000 versus $22,000 for females. The per capita income for the town was $15,091.  About 8.8% of families and 14.0% of the population were below the poverty line, including 2.6% of those under age 18 and 22.0% of those age 65 or over.

References

Towns in Bradford County, Florida
Towns in Florida